The Margravate of Meissen was a medieval principality in the area of the modern German state of Saxony. It originally was a frontier march of the Holy Roman Empire, created out of the vast Marca Geronis (Saxon Eastern March) in 965. Under the rule of the Wettin dynasty, the margravate finally merged with the former Duchy of Saxe-Wittenberg into the Saxon Electorate by 1423.

Predecessors
In the mid 9th century, the area of the later margravate was part of an eastern frontier zone of the Carolingian Empire called Sorbian March (Limes Sorabicus), after Sorbian tribes of Polabian Slavs settling beyond the Saale river. In 849, a margrave named Thachulf was documented in the Annales Fuldenses. His title is rendered as dux Sorabici limitis, "duke of the Sorbian frontier", but he and his East Frankish successors were commonly known as duces Thuringorum, "dukes of the Thuringians", as they set about establishing their power over the older Duchy of Thuringia in the west.

The Sorbian march had already lost its importance around 900 AD; the last known margrave Poppo was deposed by King Arnulf in 892 and replaced with Conrad who continued to appear as a "Duke of Thuringia". Conrad himself was replaced by Burchard, whose title in 903 was marchio Thuringionum, "margrave of the Thuringians".

Due to scarce sources, the geographical extent of the Frankish march east of the Saale is a matter of ongoing debate among historians; it may have reached up to the settlement area of the Slavic Glomacze (Talaminzi) tribes beyond the Mulde river, identified as eastern neighbours of the Sorbs by the Bavarian Geographer about 850. These territories were under constant attacks by the East Frankish rulers; in 908 they were first campaigned by the Saxon prince Henry the Fowler, son of Duke Otto the Illustrious. By 928/29, the main Glomacze fortress on the Jahna river was destroyed and their lands up to the Dresden Basin incorporated into the Marca Geronis.

Founding
 
In 928 and 929, during the final campaign against the Glomacze tribes, Henry the Fowler, East Frankish king since 919, chose a rock above the confluence of the Elbe and Triebisch rivers to erect a new fortress, called Misni (Meissen) Castle after the nearby Meisa stream. The fortifications were renamed Albrechtsburg in the 15th century.

A town soon developed around the castle. King Henry, however, made no attempts to Germanise the Slavs or to create a chain of burgwards around his fortress. Sat alone, like Brandenburg, with few defenses or towns around it; Meissen probably was temporarily occupied by Bohemian forces from 936 onwards. The town beneath the fortress grew, however, eventually becoming one of the most important cities in the vast Marca Geronis, covering the Slavic lands east of the Saxon stem duchy. King Henry, and later on his son and successor Otto I, continued the Slavic campaigns into the lands of the Polabian Milceni tribes around Bautzen (Budissin), with their gained territory being gradually incorporated into the Saxon Eastern March.

When the Marca Geronis was divided in 965 upon the death of Margrave Gero, Meissen became the center of a new march with the goal of controlling the local Slavic population. The first Meissen margrave, Wigbert, is mentioned in a 968 charter of the Archdiocese of Magdeburg. That same year, the Meissen fortress also became the see of the newly created Bishopric of Meissen. In 978, the Saxon count Rikdag became the Margrave of Meissen, and incorporated the marches of Merseburg and Zeitz into Meissen. By 982, the territory of the march had extended as far as the Kwisa (Queis) river to the east and as far as the slopes of the Ore Mountains to the south, where it shared a border with the Přemyslid duchy of Bohemia.

In 983, following the defeat of Emperor Otto II at the Battle of Stilo, the Slavic Lutici tribes bordering eastern Saxony rebelled in the Great Slav Rising. The newly established bishoprics of Havelberg and Brandenburg as well as the March of Zeitz were overrun by Lutici tribes. Margrave Rikdag joined forces with the Margraves of Lusatia and the Northern March, the Bishop of Halberstadt, and the Archbishop of Magdeburg and defeated the Slavs in the gau of Balsamgau near Stendal. Nevertheless, large territories of the Northern March were lost, and the German forces were pushed back west of the Elbe.

Margrave Eckard I from Thuringia succeeded Rikdag as Margrave of Meissen in 985. His descendants of the Ekkeharding noble family would keep the margravial title until 1046. Upon his appointment, Eckard allied with Duke Mieszko I of Poland in order to reconquer Meissen Castle from Duke Boleslaus II of Bohemia whose forces occupied it the year before. When Eckard was assassinated in 1002, however, Mieszko's son, the Polish king Bolesław I Chrobry, took the occasion to conquer the margravial lands east of the Elbe and demanded the surrender of Meissen. The following German–Polish War ended with the 1018 Peace of Bautzen, whereby Meissen had to cede the Milceni region (later Upper Lusatia) to Poland. In 1031 however, King Conrad II of Germany was able to reconquer the Milceni lands, which were returned to Meissen.

In 1046, Count Otto of Weimar-Orlamünde became margrave, followed by  Egbert II of the Brunonids upon his death in 1067. Egbert II entered into a longstanding conflict with Emperor Henry IV, because of which he had to renounce the Milceni lands to Duke Vratislaus II of Bohemia in 1076, and was finally deposed during the Investiture Controversy in 1089.

Wettin rule

Emperor Henry IV then granted Meissen to Count Henry of Eilenburg of the Wettin dynasty. The margravate would remain under Wettin rule for the rest of its existence. Under Wiprecht von Groitzsch in the 1120s, Meissen underwent a process of Germanisation. He was succeeded by Conrad the Great (1123–56), Otto the Rich (1156–91), and Dietrich the Hard-Pressed (1191–1221), under whom the march would expand and develop. By then, Meissen had become a stronghold of the Wettin dynasty, suspiciously eyed by the Hohenstaufen emperors who nevertheless were not able to deprive the margraves of their power.

In 1264, during the War of the Thuringian Succession, Margrave Henry III asserted himself in the Landgraviate of Thuringia, where his uncle Henry Raspe had died childless. Between 1243 and 1255, Henry III had also acquired the intermediate Pleisseland around Altenburg in pawn. In 1307, the attempt by the Luxembourg king Henry VII to once again subdue the Margraves of Meissen failed with his defeat at the Battle of Lucka. By that time the margravate was de facto independent of any sovereign authority. In the following years, there would be joint rule of Meissen by multiple members of the Wettin dynasty at any given time. In 1382 and 1445, this even led to the division of the march, however it would reunite soon after each time. Meissen was often enlarged by marriage, purchase, or conquest, which is how it gained the rights to the burgraviate in 1426.

In 1423, Margrave Frederick IV was assigned the heirless Duchy of Saxe-Wittenberg, formerly held by the House of Ascania, by Emperor Sigismund in turn for his support against the Hussites. The Wettin rulers thereby entered into the Saxon electorate, in which they ultimately merged their margravial lands abandoning Meissen's status as an independent principality; though they retained the margravial title. In the late 15th century, the dynasty held a large contiguous territory between the Werra and Oder rivers. By the 1485 Treaty of Leipzig, however, the Upper Saxon lands were again divided between Frederick's grandsons Ernest ruling in Wittenberg and Albert, who took the former Meissen territory. The treaty marked the beginning of the permanent separation of the two states of Saxony and Ernestine Thuringia.

Burgravate
Around 1068, Meissen Castle received its own burgrave. In time the Meinheringer family would come to control the burgravate.

See also
List of margraves of Meissen
List of margravines of Meissen
List of the burgraves of Meissen

Notes

References
Thompson, James Westfall. Feudal Germany, Volume II. New York: Frederick Ungar Publishing Co., 1928.

960s establishments in the Holy Roman Empire
1420s disestablishments in the Holy Roman Empire
1423 disestablishments in Europe
States and territories established in the 960s
Former states and territories of Thuringia
Former states and territories of Saxony
Meissen
Medieval Germany
965 establishments
Marches of the Holy Roman Empire